Teresa Ha (October 6, 1937 – August 5, 2019) was a former Chinese television and film actress from Hong Kong. Ha is credited with over 260 films.

Career
In 1956, Ha started her acting career in Hong Kong films. Ha first appeared in The Soul Stealer, a 1956 Crime film directed by Ng Wui. Ha's last film was I Love You, Mom, a 2013 film directed by Casey Chan Lai-Ying. Ha is credited with over 260 films.

Ha joined TVB in 1982 and remained active at the station until 2016. She won an award at the 2005 TVB Anniversary Gala Show.

Filmography

Films 
 1956 The Soul Stealer - Yan Fung
 1957 Caught in the Act - Ching Wai-Fong
 1957 Little Women - Mung-Seong
 1957 Love's Crime
 1958 May Heaven Bless You - Leung Tsi-Yuk
 1958 Driver No. 7 - Cheung Kit-Ying / Mimi
 1958 Mambo Lady 
 1958 Three Scholars Rival for a Wife
 1959 Daughter of a Grand Household (aka The Missing Cinderella) - Sima Hung / Lily
 1959 Dear Love - Fong Wan-Kam / Kam
 1959 The Cruel Husband - Ha Mei Ling
 1960 The Three Girl Fighters (Part 1) 
 1960 The Three Girl Fighters (Part 2) 
 1960 A Tearful Life - Sook-Jun
 1960 Salvation - Chun
 1960 The Wonder Boy
 1960 The Outcast Woman (Part 2) - Pak Yuen-Yee
 1961 Non-sensical Son-in-law - Fung Oi
 Many Aspects of Love (1961) - Lok Ha
 House of Kam Topples (Part 1) (1961) - Pak Sau-Chu
 House of Kam Topples (Part 2) (1961)
 Conflict in Phoenix Hill (1961)
 Time Flows Like a Stream (1962) - Mai Gam-Fa
 This Merry World (1962)
 Temporary Couple (1962)
 The Drifting Orphan (1962)
 Sombre Night (1962) - Tin Yee-Mui
 Sad Tale of Two Women (1962)
 How Cai Shu Subdued the Tyrant (1962)
 To Capture the God of Wealth (1962) - Chun Yun-Lan
 Sunset on the River (1962) - Chung Kwai Fong / Siu Heung
 Husband of a Rich Lady (1962)
 The Fake Married Couple (1962) - Cheong Chi-Fan
 The Wife's Husband (1962)
 One Queen and Three Kings (1963) - Si Sau-Ha
 Wife and Mistress in the Same House (1963) - Chiu Chung Ying / Mrs Chan
 Bedside Horror (1963)
 House of Prosperity (1963) - Man-Choi
 The Adventures of a Strange Man (1963) - Cheung Lei Suk-Lin
 Take the Money and Run (1963) - Kam Lan Chi
 Midnight Were-wolf (1963) - Choi Ching-Chi
 Women's World (1963) - Cheung Yuk-Kam
 The Songstresses (1963) - Tong Siu-Chun
 A Modern Girl (1963) - Lei Suk-Lin
 1964 Men and Women - Meiling
 1964 Getting Rich 
 1964 In the Neighbourhood - Ah Fung
 1964 Luck Is with You
 1964 Money for Marriage 
 1964 Half a Bed 
 1964 Take What You Can 
 1964 Pigeon Cage 
 1964 A Beautiful Ghost 
 1964 The Witty Sister
 1964 A Big Restaurant 
 1964 A Girl's Tears
 1964 Grab What You Can! 
 1964 My Darling Grandchild 
 1964 Spy No. 13 - Mak Siu-Guen
 1964 All Are Happy 
 Silent Love (1965) - Yu Pak-Mui
 Seven Unruly Girls (1965) - Ah Ping
 Blundering Detective (1965) - Tong Kam-Tim
 Moonlight (1965)
 A Tough World (1965)
 All Packed in a Small House (1965)
 Pursuit of the Murderer in the Dog-racing Court (1965) - Cheung Lai-bing
 Between Man and Ghost (1965)
 The Espionage (1966)
 The Secret Agent and the Mysterious Gang (1966) - Chiu Lai-Jan
 Pursuit of a Murderer (1966) - Cheung Man-Wai
 How Master Cute Thrice Saved the Idiot Ming (1966) - Siu Chi
 Spy Vs. Spy (1966)
 The Car Owner (1966)
 The Strange Hero Yi Zhimei (1967)
 Tragedy in a Fishing Village (1967)
 Paragon of Sword and Knife (1967)
 Prodigal in Distress (1967)
 Incredible Rumour (1968) - Mei-Lian
 Hotel Blues (1968) - Zaza
 Won't You Give Me a Kiss? (1968) - Honey
 Joy to the World (1968) - Yam Yuk-zi
 Red Lamp Shaded in Blood (1968) - Bak Mun-ping
 The Vengeful Spirit (1968)
 Getting Rich in a Blind Way (1968) - Suk-lan's mother
 Paragon of Sword and Knife (Grand Finale) (1968)
 Blue Falcon (1968)
 The Admirers of the Girl in the Mini-skirt (1968) - Cheng's wife
 Two Sisters Who Steal (1969) - Wong Man-Lan
 The Smart Master and the Shrewd Rich Girl (1969) - Chow Yuk-Mui
 Where the Dragon Dares (1969)
 Teddy Girls (1969) - Tsui's mother
 A Child in Need of a Mother's Love (1969)
 The Romantic Girl Who Plays Hard-to-Get (1969) - Ah Kiu
 The Liar (1969) - Jenny
 1970 Love Song Over the Sea - Chang Gai-yun
 1970 Apartment for Ladies - Lulu. 
 The Golden Seal (1971) - Feng Hui Ming
 Call to Arms (1971) - Lady Ping Yuan Chun
 It Takes a Man to Be Henpecked (1971)
 Let's Go to Bed (1972)
 The 14 Amazons (1972) - Tung Yueh Ngo
 Yu zhong hua (1972)
 Flower in the Rain (1972) - Ah Ying
 1973 Dao bing fu - Lady Ping Yuan-chun
 1973 Facets of Love  - Old Fo
 1973 Tales of Larceny (Part 2) - Lu Shu Zhen
 1973 River of Fury - Opera troupe member
 1973 Illicit Desire (Part 2) - Sun Xue-Bo (wife #4) 
 1973 The Sugar Daddies - Mrs. Fung
 The Golden Lotus (1974) - Fourth lady / Sun Hsueh o
 Thirteen (1974) - Lan Ching
 Heung gong chat sup sam (1974)
 Sex For Sale (1974) - Mrs. Ou
 Hong Kong 73 (1974) - Lee Mei Ying
 Sinful Confession (1974) - Mahjong gambler
 The Tea House (1974) - Auntie Tan
 Ghost Eyes (1974) - Yuen Man
 Kidnap (1974) - Ah Chen
 Ai xin jian wan wan (1975) - Mrs. Su
 Night of the Devil's Bride (1975) - Nurse of Cui's house
 Carry on Con Men (1975)
 The Big Holdup (1975) - Ying
 Two Con Men (1975) - [Scenes cut]
 Evil Seducers (1975) - Buddhist nun
 My Bewitched Wife (1975) - Mrs. Wong
 Big Brother Cheng (1975) - Tan Yi
 Temperament of Life (1975)
 Cuties Parade (1975)
 Love Lock (1975) - Zhou's mother
 The Spiritual Boxer (1975) - Lin's wife
 The Wedding Night (1975)
 It's All in the Family (1975) - Susan's mother
 The Playboy (1975)
 The Criminals (1976) (Part 2) - Auntie Eight
 King Gambler (1976) - Mrs Sha Wu Lin
 Spirit of the Raped (1976) - Fan's wife
 Killer Clans (1976) - Yu Hsia
 Wedding Nights (1976) - Granny Wang
 Beautiful Vixen (1976) - Mrs. Huang
 Emperor Chien Lung (1976) - Madam Ping, the witch
 Love Swindler (1976) (Part 3) - Looking at Jade Ring
 Big Bad Sis (1976) - Ah Fong's mother
 The Escort Girls (1976)
 The Magic Blade (1976) - Devil Grandma
 Hustler from Canton (1976)
 Du wang da pian ju (1976)
 Clans of Intrigue (1977) - Su Xian Xian
 Assault - The Criminals, Part IV (1977) (Part 2) - Liu Gu
 Ren she shu (1977)
 Death Duel (1977) - Mute's wife
 The Battle Wizard (1977) - Chief Zhong's wife
 The Call-Girls (1977) - Dr. Yun's wife
 The Teenager's Nightmare (1977) (Part 2) - Mother of victim
 Dreams of Eroticism (1977) - Zhou Rui
 Chinatown Kid (1977) - Xu Hao's wife
 The Mysterious Heroes (1977) - Lady Hua
 Murder on the Wedding Night (1977)
 Yin xia en chou lu (1978)
 Clan of Amazons (1978) - 2nd Sister
 Heroes of the East (1978) - Wedding guest
 The Proud Youth (1978) - Abbess Yixin
 Shaolin Mantis (1978) - Gi Gi's 1st aunt
 Swordsman and Enchantress (1978) - Old woman in Puppet Villa
 Sensual Pleasures (1978) - Mrs. Jin
 Heaven Sword and Dragon Sabre (1978) - Granny Jin Hwa
 Heaven Sword and Dragon Sabre, Part II (1978) - Granny Jin Hwa / Daisy
 The Mad Monk Strikes Again (1978) - Madam Ba Gu
 Full Moon Scimitar (1979) - Tung's wife
 The Scandalous Warlord (1979) - Generalissimo Feng's mother
 The Deadly Breaking Sword (1979) - Madam Li Xing
 The Ghosts and I (1979)
 Murder Plot (1979) - Chun Qiu
 Heaven and Hell (1980) - Yen
 Disco Bumpkins (1980) - Fan's mother
 Killer Constable (1980) - Ah Niu's wife
 Swift Sword (1980) - Madam Guan
 Rendezvous with Death (1980)
 The Tiger and the Widow (1981) - Auntie Suen
 The Emperor and His Brother (1981) - Chief Chou's wife
 Notorious Eight (1981) - Mrs. Xia
 Bloody Parrot (1981) - Madam Song
 A Bride's Nightmare (1981)
 Revenge of the Corpse (1981) - Lu's servant
 Winner Takes All (1982) - Xi Mo's mother
 Clan Feuds (1982) - Madam Zhu
 Lovers Blades (1982) - Gai Bao's mother
 Hell Has No Boundary (1982) - Madam Chi
 Human Lanterns (1982) - Brothel madam
 The 82 Tenants (1982) - Ah Xia
 Godfather from Canton (1982) - Yu
 My Rebellious Son (1982) - Herbal tea seller
 Ode to Gallantry (1982) - Princess Mei Fanggu
 Pituitary Hunter (1982)
 Twinkle Twinkle Little Star (1983) - Wife of beauty shop owner
 Air Disaster (1983)
 The Rape After (1984) - Nurse Yin
 Pale Passion (1984) - Ah Hsia's mother
 My Lucky Stars (1985) - Ping (Tsao's wife)
 Rose (1986) - Nanny
 The Millionaires' Express (1986) - Cotton weaver's mother
 Lucky Stars Go Places (1986) - Ping
 Life Is a Moment (1987) - Fong's maid
 Evil Cat (1987) - Long's Mom
 Trouble Couples (1987) - Actress on TV
 Into the Fire (1989) - Le's mother
 Final Run (1989)
 Queen of Temple Street (1990) - Older Woman
 Against All (1990) - K. K.'s mother
 The Set Up (1990) - Mother
 Changing Partner (1992) - Yau's grandmother [uncredited]
 To Liv(e) (1992)
 Call Girl '92 (1992) - Nancy's aunt
 Raped by an Angel (1993) - Tat's mother
 Boys Are Easy (1993) - Mrs. Wu
 Love to Kill (1993)
 Ghost Lantern (1993) - Granny Four
 The Kung Fu Scholar (1994) - Granny beggar
 Hail the Judge (1994) - Sing's mother
 Give and Take (1994)
 The Crucifixion (1994) - Yau's mother
 Modern Romance (1994) - Bartender
 The Wrath of Silence (1994) - Chi's master
 Beginner's Luck  (1994) - Aunt Lan
 Those Were the Days... (1995) - Ko Fei's mother
 Lover of the Last Empress (1995) - Yu Lan / Tzu Hsi's mother
 Summer Snow (1995) - Mrs. Han
 Tricky Business (1995) - Hospital orderly
 The Saint of Gamblers (1995) - God Bless You's mother
 Heaven Can't Wait (1995) - Chun's grandmother
 O.C.T.B. Case - The Floating Body (1995) - Mother Li
 Full Throttle (1995) - Jiale's grandmother
 Young and Dangerous (1996) - Kwan's mother
 Hong Kong Showgirls (1996) - Mary
 4 Faces of Eve (1996) - Miu Si's mother
 Blind Romance (1996) - Grandma
 Once Upon a Time in Triad Society 2 (1996) - Keung
 Stooge, My Love (1996) - Auntie San
 Passionate Nights (1997) - Mrs Ma
 Killing Me Tenderly (1997) - Su Kan's mother
 Those Were the Days (1997) - Siu Fong Fong's mother
 Step Into the Dark (1998) - May May's mother
 Love in the River (1998) - Mrs Mill
 Raped by an Angel 2: The Uniform Fan (1998) - Po Wan's grandmother
 Casino (1998) - Wan's mother
 How to Get Rich by Fung Shui? (1998)
 Tales in the Wind (1998)
 Gigolo of Chinese Hollywood (1999) - Kam's mother
 My Good Brother (1999)
 The Legend of Speed (1999) - Kelly's grandmother
 Desirous Express (2000)
 Don't Look Back- Or You'll Be Sorry!! (2000) - Woman passing Marianne in the stairs
 Let It Be (2000)
 Queen of Kowloon (2000) - Heung
 The Accidental Spy (2001) - Cleaner in freight lift
 Fighting for Love (2001) - Mrs. Chuck
 Fing's Raver (2001)
 Gangs 2001 (2001)
 U-Man (2002) - Candy's grandmother
 Hooker's World (2002) - Auntie Luke
 Jiang Hu (2004) - Lefty's mother
 House of the Invisibles (2007) - Wong Po
 Flash Point (2007) - Tony's mother
 Echoes of the Rainbow (2010) - Grandmother
 Life Without Principle (2011)
 I Love You, Mom (2013) - (final film role)

Personal life
Her godson is Gordon Lam. On 5 August 2019, Ha died in her sleep in Hong Kong. She was 81 years old.

References

External links
 
 HK Cinemagic entry
 Teresa Ha Ping at hkmdb.com

1937 births
2019 deaths
Hong Kong actresses
Hong Kong film actresses
Hong Kong Buddhists